Germano Grachane C.M. (born May 4, 1942 in Zandamela, Zavala District) is a Mozambican clergyman, who is the Bishop of Nacala.
He was ordained a priest of the Congregation of the Vincentians on 24 May 1970. On 22 January 1990 Pope John Paul II appointed him auxiliary bishop in Nampula and Titular Bishop of Thunusuda. He received his episcopal consecration as Archbishop of Nampula from Manuel Vieira Pinto, on June 3 of that year; Co-consecrators were Paulo Mandlate, Bishop of Tete, and Júlio Duarte Langa, Bishop of Xai-Xai.
On 11 October 1991 he was appointed Bishop of Nacala.

References

21st-century Roman Catholic bishops in Mozambique
20th-century Roman Catholic bishops in Mozambique
1942 births
Living people
People from Inhambane Province
Vincentian bishops
Roman Catholic bishops of Nacala